This is a list of Gujarati language films that were released in 2021. The film industry continued to be affected by COVID-19 pandemic. The theatres were kept closed in March–April 2021 due to resurgence of the pandemic.

January–March

April – June

July – September

October – December

References

External links
 List of Gujarati films of 2021 at the Internet Movie Database

2021
Gujarati
Gujarati